Martina Dimoska (born 18 September 1992) is a Macedonian footballer who plays as a midfielder for the North Macedonia national team.

International career
Dimoska made her debut for the North Macedonia national team on 19 September 2009, against Slovakia.

References

1992 births
Living people
Women's association football midfielders
Macedonian women's footballers
North Macedonia women's international footballers